Felix Rottenberg (born 4 June 1957, in Amsterdam) is a Dutch politician and former chair of the Labour Party.

References

1957 births
Chairmen of the Labour Party (Netherlands)
Dutch Jews
Dutch political commentators
Dutch radio personalities
Dutch television presenters
Dutch speechwriters
Jewish Dutch politicians
Labour Party (Netherlands) politicians
Living people
Politicians from Amsterdam